Joseph Green (April 23, 1900 – June 20, 1996), born Yoysef Grinberg, a.k.a. Josef Grünberg, Joseph Greenberg and Joseph Greene, a Polish-born Jew who emigrated to the United States in 1924, was an actor in Yiddish theater and one of the few directors of Yiddish-language films. He made four Yiddish films that he shot on location in Poland, beginning in 1935: Yidl mitn fidl (Yiddle with his Fiddle; 1935), Der Purimspiler (The Jester; 1937), Mamele (Little Mother; 1938), and A brivele der mamen (A Little Letter to Mother; 1939).<ref>"[http://www.jewishfilm.org/Catalogue/films/alettertomother.htm A Letter to Mother / A Brivele der Maman]". The National Center for Jewish Film. jewishfilm.org. Retrieved 2017-06-23.</ref> He also wrote the screenplays for the films, except for Mamele.

Born in Łódź (Poland), then in Congress Poland, part of the Russian Empire, he attended a traditional Jewish cheder, or elementary school, and then a state gymnasium (high school). In 1915, during the First World War, he trained at the drama school of German theater director Walter Wassermann, who was then heading the Deutsches Theater in Lodz, and in 1916 he made his debut as an actor with the Lodz-based amateur troupe of Zalmen Zylbercweig.

Green had small roles  in The Jazz Singer, in 1927, and A Daughter of her People, in 1932. Also in 1932 he provided the Yiddish-language dubbing for the silent Italian film Joseph in the Land of Egypt.
  
He died of emphysema at the age of 96 in Great Neck, Long Island, New York.

Green was interviewed in the 1985 British documentary on Yiddish Films, Almonds and Raisins''.

See also 
 Abe Ellstein
 Molly Picon

References

External links
 

American male film actors
American film directors
Yiddish-language film directors
Yiddish theatre performers
American people of Polish-Jewish descent
Actors from Łódź
1900 births
1996 deaths
20th-century American male actors
Polish emigrants to the United States